Bascom is a town in Jackson County, Florida, United States, located  south of the Alabama border. The population was 121 at the 2010 census.

Geography

Bascom is located in northeastern Jackson County at  (30.928769, –85.117067).

Demographics

2020 census

As of the 2020 United States census, there were 87 people, 34 households, and 19 families residing in the town.

2000 census
As of the census of 2000, there were 106 people, 41 households, and 33 families residing in the town. The population density was 448.3 inhabitants per square mile (170.5/km2). The racial makeup of the town was 100.00% White.

There were 41 households, out of which 26.8% had children under the age of 18 living with them, 65.9% were married couples living together, 12.2% had a female householder with no husband present, and 19.5% were non-families. 19.5% of all households were made up of individuals, and 12.2% had someone living alone who was 65 years of age or older. The average household size was 2.59 and the average family size was 2.97.

In the town, the population was spread out, with 26.4% under the age of 18, 4.7% from 18 to 24, 25.5% from 25 to 44, 28.3% from 45 to 64, and 15.1% who were 65 years of age or older. The median age was 39 years. For every 100 females, there were 112.0 males. For every 100 females age 18 and over, there were 95.0 males.

The median income for a household in the town was $27,000, and the median income for a family was $30,208. Males had a median income of $26,250 versus $15,000 for females. The per capita income for the town was $11,305. There were 6.5% of families and 6.3% of the population living below the poverty line, including 8.1% of under eighteens and 11.8% of those over 64.

Notable people

 Henry Bidleman Bascom, famous circuit-riding preacher  who became a Congressional chaplain and served as president of Madison College and of Transylvania University before being ordained a Methodist bishop
 Faye Dunaway (born 1941), actress

References

Towns in Jackson County, Florida
Towns in Florida